"Cannoneer" as a term for an artilleryman dates from the 16th century.  the United States Army uses as titles for such a soldier: "13B" (thirteen bravo) M.O.S. (military occupational specialty code), a "cannon crewmember" or  "cannoneer" for short. These "artillery-men" support infantry units in training, and on battlefields play an integral part in combat operations ranging from urban to jungle terrains.

An artillery  private is known as a Kanonier in German, as a kanonier in historical Polish contexts, as a kanonnier in Dutch, and as a kanonir in historical Russian army and navy contexts; today, these would likely be rendered in English as "cannon". Artillery originated for use against ground targets—against infantry, cavalry, fortifications, armor, and other artillery. It can be used in a direct or indirect manner depending on circumstances. It can also be utilized in  airborne and  air-assault missions.

Combat occupations
Military ranks
18th- and 19th-century warrior types